The Dakota Northern Railroad  is a Class III short line railroad that operates over 72 miles (116 kilometres) of track in the northeastern portion of the U.S. state of North Dakota.
The Dakota Northern Railroad, headquartered in Crookston, Minnesota, is co-owned by KBN Incorporated and Independent Locomotive Service.

As of 2006, the Dakota Northern Railroad employed 6 people. The primary commodities hauled included grain, coal, potato, fertilizers, and ethanol.

The railroad interchanges with the BNSF Railway in Grafton, North Dakota.

History

The Dakota Northern Railroad was created in January 2006 after the BNSF Railway decided to lease approximately 72 miles (116 kilometres) of branch line trackage to KBN Incorporated and Independent Locomotive Service for an initial 10-year period.

The track leased to the Dakota Northern Railroad consists of an approximate 23 mile (37 kilometre) segment of the Glasston Subdivision between Grafton, North Dakota and Glasston, North Dakota as well as the approximate 49 mile (79 kilometre) Walhalla Subdivision between Grafton, North Dakota and Walhalla, North Dakota.

The piece of the Glasston Subdivision leased to the Dakota Northern Railroad is part of a segment of track that was once owned by the Great Northern Railway and extended from Grand Forks, North Dakota to Gretna, Manitoba. The Burlington Northern Railroad (a successor to the Great Northern Railway) abandoned the track to its current terminus of Glasston in 1993.

The Walhalla Subdivision was also once owned by the Great Northern Railway. The line extended from Grafton, North Dakota to Morden, Manitoba in the early 20th century, but was abandoned to the current terminus of Walhalla in 1936.

The Dakota Northern recently filed to abandon its Glasston Subdivision in eastern North Dakota, an 18-mile line that has not been used since the spring of 2009 due to bridge conditions.

Locomotive and Freight Car Fleet

Dakota Northern Railroad co-owner Independent Locomotive Service supplies the railroad with two locomotives: an EMD GP10 lettered ILSX 1391, and another EMD GP10 lettered ILSX 1392. The GP10 locomotives feature the words "Independent Locomotive Service" on the long hood.

The locomotives have maroon paint with gold lettering. These colors also appear on the majority of locomotives operating on the Minnesota Northern Railroad, which is itself co-owned by the same two companies that co-own the Dakota Northern Railroad.

The railroad does not directly own or lease any freight cars. Instead, all of the freight cars it uses are provided by the BNSF Railway.

Stations on the Dakota Northern Railroad

The Dakota Northern Railroad operates on track that goes through the following communities:

 Auburn, North Dakota
 Backoo, North Dakota
 Cavalier, North Dakota
 Crystal, North Dakota
 Glasston, North Dakota
 Grafton, North Dakota (also a BNSF station)
 Hensel, North Dakota
 Hoople, North Dakota
 Leyden, North Dakota
 Nash, North Dakota
 St. Thomas, North Dakota
 Walhalla, North Dakota

References

Notes

Sources
   	
 

North Dakota railroads
Spin-offs of the BNSF Railway